Herman Schalow (17 January 1852 – 9 December 1925), also incorrectly written Hermann Schalow, was a German ornithologist.

Herman Schalow was a banker; He studied ornithology as an amateur with Jean Louis Cabanis (1816–1906) and worked with Anton Reichenow (1847–1941). Between 1894 and 1907, he was Vice President and 1907–1921 President of the German Ornithological Society.

Schalow was the author of Die Musophagidae (1886), Die Vögel der Arktis, Birds of the Arctic (1905) and many scientific papers on birds. He also edited the travelogue written by Richard Böhm (1854–1884) Ostafrika, Sansibar und Tanganjika heraus: Von Sansibar zum Tanganjika, Briefe aus Ostafrika von Dr. Richard Böhm (J. A. Brockhaus, Leipzig 1888).

Schalow described 270 species. The Berlin Museum of Natural History honoured him by naming a library after him, and Anton Reichenow named Schalow's turaco for him.

References

 Bo Beolens, Michael Watkins (2003): Whose Bird? Common Bird Names and the People They Commemorate. Yale University Press (New Haven, London)
 Maurice Boubier (1925): L'Évolution de l'ornithology. Librairie Félix Alcan (Paris), Nouvelle collection scientifique: ii + 308 p.
 Ludwig Gebhardt (2006): Die Ornithologen Mitteleuropas. Aula-Verlag, Wiebelsheim.
 Wolfgang Mädlow: Notes on the new version. In. Herman Schalow: Contributions to the bird fauna of the Mark Brandenburg. edition, published by the Association of Berlin - Brandenburg ornithologists (ABBO) Rangsdorf, 2004. 

German ornithologists
1925 deaths
1852 births
Scientists from Berlin
German bankers